Jan Jakob Maria de Groot (18 February 185424 September 1921) was a Dutch sinologist and historian of religion. He taught at the Leiden University and later at the University of Berlin, and is chiefly remembered for his monumental work, The Religious System of China, Its Ancient Forms, Evolution, History and Present Aspect, Manners, Customs and Social Institutions Connected Therewith. The two "books" of this detailed and well-illustrated treatise appeared in six volumes - and, according to the preface in the first volume, the System was originally meant to include  several more "books".

De Groot became a corresponding member of the Royal Netherlands Academy of Arts and Sciences in 1887, a foreign member in 1892 and a regular member in 1911.

Bibliography 
 J. J. M. De Groot, The Religious System of China, Brill, Leiden, 1892-1910, rééd. Taipei 1964 
 vol. I : Disposal of the Dead. Part I : Funeral rites. Part II : The ideas of resurrection, 1892, XXIV-360 p 
 vol. II : Disposal of the Dead. Part III : The Grave (first half), 1894, 468 p. : book I : Disposal of the Dead, p. 359-827 
 vol. III : Disposal of the Dead. The Grave (second half). Fung-shui,1897, 640 p. 
 vol. IV : The soul and Ancestral Worship. Part I : The Soul in Philosophy and Folk-Conception, 464 p. 
 vol. V : The soul and Ancestral Worship. Part II : Demonology. Part III :  Sorcery, 1908, 464 p. 
 vol. VI : The soul and Ancestral Worship. Part IV : The War against Spectres. Part V : The prietshood of Animism (wu), 1910, 414 p. 
 index for volumes I, II, III, 40 p.
 J. J. M. De Groot, Universismus - Die Grundlage der Religion und Ethik, des Staatswesens und der Wissenschaften Chinas

Sources

External links
 Sinologists: J J M de Groot, 1854 - 1921
 Works of Jan Jakob Maria de Groot on archive.org - in English, German, and French
 Leiden University page
 M.W. de Visser: 'Levensbericht van Prof. Dr. J.J.M. de Groot'. In: Jaarboek van de Maatschappij der Nederlandse Letterkunde, 1922, p. 1-16

1854 births
1921 deaths
Dutch historians of religion
Linguists from the Netherlands
Dutch sinologists
Academic staff of Leiden University
Academic staff of the Humboldt University of Berlin
People from Schiedam
Members of the Royal Netherlands Academy of Arts and Sciences
Dutch expatriates in Germany